Barbara K. Altmann (born January 31, 1957) is a Canadian academic and college administrator. She became the 16th president of Franklin & Marshall College, and she is the first female to fill that role. Altmann was previously a provost at Bucknell University.

Early life and education 
Altmann was born and raised in Edmonton, Alberta. She is the child of German immigrants and was a first-generation college student. Altmann earned a B.A. in romance languages from University of Alberta. She completed a M.A. and Ph.D. in medieval French language and literature from University of Toronto in 1988. Altmann also played basketball as an undergraduate.

Career 
She was on the faculty at University of Oregon for over two decades. In her last three years, she was the senior vice provost for academic affairs. In 2015, she joined Bucknell University as a provost and professor of French. She became the 16th president of Franklin & Marshall College in 2018, succeeding Daniel R. Porterfield and interim president Eric Noll. Altmann is the first female president of the college.

Personal life 
, Altmann has resided in the United States for almost 30 years and is a permanent resident. She maintains her Canadian citizenship. Altmann married John T. Stacey, a psychologist, and has two sons. Her brother has a Ph.D. in artificial intelligence, and her sister "has a doctorate in library science."

See also 

 List of women presidents or chancellors of co-ed colleges and universities

References 

Living people
Canadian expatriate academics in the United States
People from Edmonton
Canadian women academics
University of Alberta alumni
University of Toronto alumni
University of Oregon faculty
Bucknell University faculty
Presidents of Franklin & Marshall College
Canadian people of German descent
1957 births